Zekeriya Alp (born 1 January 1948) is a Turkish former international association football player and, current businessman and sports executive. He represented Turkey at senior level in 22 international encounters. Alp formerly took role of "Head of Central Referee Commission" at TFF.

Career
Following his youth and first two senior years at 1. Lig, Alp joined Beşiktaş in 1968–69 season. He played at Beşiltaş until the end of his professional career.

Zekeriya Alp was appointed twice as Head of Central Referee Commission at TFF. His first appointment was between 2012 and 2014 during the presidency of Yıldırım Demirören. In 2019, he appointed once again for same title following election of Nihat Özdemir.

Honours
Beşiktaş
 Turkish Cup (1): 1974–75 Turkish Cup
 Presidential Cup (1): 1974
 Prime Minister's Cup (2): 1974, 1977
 TSYD Cup (3): 1971–72, 1972–73, 1974–75
 Spor Toto Cup (1): 1969

Individual
Beşiktaş J.K. Squads of Century (Golden Team)

References
Citations

External links
 Zekeriya Alp at TFF

1948 births
Turkish footballers
Turkey under-21 international footballers
Turkey international footballers
Association football defenders
Footballers from Istanbul
Süper Lig players
Beşiktaş J.K. footballers
Living people